Critical Review may refer to:

The Critical Review, English newspaper published from 1756 to 1817
Critical Review (Brown University), student publication of course evaluations at Brown University, published since 1976
Critical Review (journal), a scholarly quarterly published by the Critical Review Foundation since 1986

The Critical Review, a Chinese academic journal published from 1922 to 1933